Chariesthes formosa is a species of beetle in the family Cerambycidae. It was described by Karl Jordan in 1894. It is known from Gabon.

References

Endemic fauna of Gabon
Chariesthes
Beetles described in 1894